Waipu is a small town established in the rohe of the Patuharakeke hapū, in Te Tai Tokerau the Northland Region of New Zealand.  The town is celebrated for its settlement by Nova Scotians and other settlers of  Scottish heritage. A highlight of the town's calendar is the annual Highland Games held at New Year.  Near the town are the Waipu Caves, which contain a significant population of glow worms.

History

The tangata whenua of Waipū, Patuharakeke are the descendants of Te Toru (also known as Urekuri),
Te Taotahi and Te Pirihi Whakaariki. It is through the descendants of
Te Toru that Patuharakeke are closely related to iwi including Ngapuhi,
Ngati Wai, Ngati Whatua and Te Uri o Hau. Through a series of Crown breaches, outlined in the Patuharakeke Statement of Claim provided in support of the Waitangi Tribunal Cases 745 and 1348, Patuharakeke were alienated from their lands which were confiscated, cleared and on-sold by the crown for colonial settlement. 

Waipu was the centre of a significant Presbyterian settlement led by Rev. Norman McLeod, a Presbyterian minister who led his people from the Highlands of Scotland to New Zealand via Pictou and St. Ann's in Nova Scotia and Australia. In 1854 the land was purchased by the crown and then on sold to the Settlers. About 800 settlers arrived at Waipu in the 1850s. Waipu was a location for the late 19th/early 20th century kauri gum digging trade.

In 1914, a railway branch line from the North Auckland Line was surveyed to Waipu to serve agricultural activity in the area.  Construction of the Waipu Branch line was delayed due to World War I, but by 1920, 25 men were employed in the construction of formation.  However, by 1924, private motor vehicles were becoming more common and railway lines to sparsely-populated rural areas accordingly became less necessary.  Due to the lack of significant industrial activity in the Waipu area, the branch line was no longer seen as economic and construction was cancelled before any rail tracks were laid. A new railway line, the Marsden Point Branch, is currently proposed for construction and will follow a route similar to that of the abortive Waipu line.

Demographics
Statistics New Zealand describes Waipū as a small urban area. Waipū urban area is part of the larger Waipu statistical area.

Waipū had a population of 1,041 at the 2018 New Zealand census, an increase of 198 people (23.5%) since the 2013 census, and an increase of 306 people (41.6%) since the 2006 census. There were 444 households, comprising 489 males and 546 females, giving a sex ratio of 0.9 males per female, with 147 people (14.1%) aged under 15 years, 96 (9.2%) aged 15 to 29, 378 (36.3%) aged 30 to 64, and 423 (40.6%) aged 65 or older.

Ethnicities were 90.5% European/Pākehā, 17.6% Māori, 1.2% Pacific peoples, 3.5% Asian, and 1.7% other ethnicities. People may identify with more than one ethnicity.

Although some people chose not to answer the census's question about religious affiliation, 49.0% had no religion, 39.2% were Christian, 0.9% were Hindu, 1.2% were Buddhist and 3.2% had other religions.

Of those at least 15 years old, 135 (15.1%) people had a bachelor's or higher degree, and 255 (28.5%) people had no formal qualifications. 84 people (9.4%) earned over $70,000 compared to 17.2% nationally. The employment status of those at least 15 was that 294 (32.9%) people were employed full-time, 108 (12.1%) were part-time, and 18 (2.0%) were unemployed.

Waipu statistical area

Waipu statistical area had a population of 2,715 at the 2018 New Zealand census, an increase of 633 people (30.4%) since the 2013 census, and an increase of 897 people (49.3%) since the 2006 census. There were 1,113 households, comprising 1,350 males and 1,368 females, giving a sex ratio of 0.99 males per female. The median age was 53.2 years (compared with 37.4 years nationally), with 405 people (14.9%) aged under 15 years, 291 (10.7%) aged 15 to 29, 1,221 (45.0%) aged 30 to 64, and 801 (29.5%) aged 65 or older.

Ethnicities were 92.4% European/Pākehā, 14.5% Māori, 1.9% Pacific peoples, 2.7% Asian, and 1.7% other ethnicities. People may identify with more than one ethnicity.

The percentage of people born overseas was 21.0, compared with 27.1% nationally.

Although some people chose not to answer the census's question about religious affiliation, 54.5% had no religion, 34.6% were Christian, 0.3% were Hindu, 0.4% were Buddhist and 2.7% had other religions.

Of those at least 15 years old, 432 (18.7%) people had a bachelor's or higher degree, and 450 (19.5%) people had no formal qualifications. The median income was $28,100, compared with $31,800 nationally. 330 people (14.3%) earned over $70,000 compared to 17.2% nationally. The employment status of those at least 15 was that 903 (39.1%) people were employed full-time, 369 (16.0%) were part-time, and 66 (2.9%) were unemployed.

Education 
Waipu School is a coeducational contributing primary (years 1–6) school with a roll of  students as of 

Schools were formed in the Waipu area at Bream Tail, Waipu Centre, The Braigh, North River and Waipu Cove. The schools at Bream Tail and Waipu Caves closed before 1930. The remaining schools, and one at Mata north of Ruakaka, were consolidated into Waipu District High School in 1940, which provided both primary and secondary education on a single site on St Mary's Road. Ruakaka School was originally intended to be included in the consolidation, but residents of Ruakaka resisted. In 1956, the secondary department moved to a new site in Argyle Street, although some secondary classes remained at the original site. By the late 1960s, Waipu was the largest District High School in the country and had inadequate facilities. The school was split at the beginning of 1972 to form the new Bream Bay College and Waipu Primary, with the high school shifting to new premises at Ruakaka in 1974. The primary school moved to the Argyle Street site.

Notable people
Members of the metal band Alien Weaponry come from Waipu.

Fiona Kidman lived in Waipu for two years as a teen. This inspired her book – The Book of Secrets.

References

Further reading

External links
Waipu Online
Waipu Caledonian Society
Waipu Scottish Migration Museum
 Waipu Primary School
Waipu Presbyterian Church
Waipu Boat and Fishing Club

Whangarei District
Populated places in the Northland Region